Project Accessory, is an American reality television series, a spin-off of the series Project Runway. It began airing on Lifetime on October 28, 2011. On the show, contestants were given challenges in which they must create various fashion accessories (ranging from jewelry and headpieces to handbags and shoes) with restrictions for materials, subject matter, and time. One or more contestants were eliminated each episode after appearing before a judging panel.

Judges and mentor
Molly Sims - Host and judge
Kenneth Cole - American fashion designer, activist
Ariel Foxman - Editor, InStyle Magazine
Eva Jeanbart-Lorenzotti - Mentor

Contestants
Source:

Progress
Source: 

 The designer won Project Accessory.
 The designer won the challenge.
 The designer was in the top two, or the first announced into the top 3, but did not win.
 The designer had one of the highest scores for that challenge, but did not place in the top two.
 The designer had one of the lowest scores for that challenge, but was not in the bottom two.
 The designer was in the bottom two, but was not eliminated.
 The designer was eliminated from the competition.

Elimination process 
The judges announce the safe designers. The remaining designers are labeled as either the highest or lowest scoring designers. These designers are given critiques and are then told to leave the runway. Once they are brought back, the other designers that aren't in the top two are announced safe. Then the winner is announced, and the remaining top designer is in the top 2. The remaining designers are the lowest scoring designers. The people who aren't in the bottom two are announced safe. The bottom two remain, and one is then eliminated.

Episodes

Episode 1: Accessorize This?!
The 12 designers were welcomed by host and mentor at a storage facility in which they had to make a necklace, a belt and another accessory of their choice using materials found in the storage facilities.
Original Airdate: October 27, 2011
Guest Judge: Debra Messing

WINNER: Nina Cortes
ELIMINATED: Cotrice Simpson

Episode 2: Sole Searching
The remaining 11 designers were sent to the Swarovski Crystal store where they picked a piece to inspire them. They had to make a pair of shoes as well as two accessories.
Original Airdate: November 3, 2011
Guest Judge: Nadja Swarovski

WINNER: James Sommerfeldt
ELIMINATED: Kelly Horton

Episode 3: Bling It On
The designers are given 24 hours to complete their next challenge, but Eva drops a surprise on them. 
Original Airdate: November 10, 2011
Guest Judge: Kelly Osbourne

WINNER: Christina Caruso
ELIMINATED: David Grieco, Nicolina Royale

Episode 4: Its in the Bag
The designers are matched with an eBay customer featured on the site for their unique fashion sense.
Original Airdate: November 17, 2011
Guest Judge: Kara Ross, Rebecca Minkoff

WINNER: Diego Rocha
ELIMINATED: James Sommerfeldt

Episode 5: Beach Blanket Blingo
The designers go to the beach for a challenge.
Original Airdate: December 1, 2011
Guest Judge: Rachel Roy, Jenna Lyons

WINNER: Brian Burkhardt
ELIMINATED: Shea Curry

Episode 6: Fall for Kenneth
The designers go on a field trip to a fashion magnate's headquarters and discover a coveted prize. 
Original Airdate: December 8, 2011
Guest Judge: Alexa Chung

WINNER: Brian Burkhardt
ELIMINATED: Adrian Dana

Episode 7: Bugging Out
The designers search for inspiration at a curiosity shop to create a signature accessory.
Original Airdate: December 15, 2011
Guest Judge: Brian Atwood

WINNER: Rich Sandomeno
ELIMINATED: Christina Curoso, Diego Rocha

Episode 8: Finale
The season concludes with the final three designers presenting their creations to New York's fashion elite. In a plot twist, each of the three finalists is allowed to choose a partner to help finish their collections. Brian Burkhardt enlists shoemaker James Sommerfeldt, Rich Sandomeno chooses handbag designer Diego Rocha, and Nina Cortes picks handbag designer Kelly Horton. Later, the winner is selected by the judges.
Original Airdate: December 22, 2011
Guest Judge: Lorraine Schwartz

WINNER: Brian Burkhardt, with shoes and accessories made by James Sommerfeldt
ELIMINATED: Nina Cortes, Rich Sandomeno

References

External links
  The Huffington Post Finale Recap
 Official website

Project Runway
2010s American reality television series
2011 American television series debuts
2011 American television series endings
2011 in fashion
2011 American television seasons
American television spin-offs
English-language television shows
Lifetime (TV network) original programming
Reality television spin-offs
Television series by The Weinstein Company